Muğancıq Müslüm (also, Mughanjyg Muslum and  Mughanjyg-Muslum) is a village and municipality in the Sharur District of Nakhchivan, Azerbaijan. It is located in the near of the Nakhchivan-Sadarak highway, on the plain. Its population is busy with tobacco-growing, vegetable-growing, hunting, beet-growing and animal husbandry. There are secondary school, library, club and a medical center in the village. It has a population of 749.

Etymology
Place of residence was formed as a result of the settling the families belonging to the muğanlı (mughanly) tribe under the leadership of the person named Muslum. The name means "muğanlılar belonging to Muslum" or "a piece from muğanlılar which belongs to Muslum".

References 

Populated places in Sharur District